Lawrence 'Larry' G. McDonald is a New York Times bestselling author and CNBC contributor, currently founder of 'The Bear Traps Report', an investment newsletter focused on Political and Systemic Risk with actionable trade ideas and Macro perspective.  Former Head of U.S. Macro Strategy at Societe Generale and former vice-president of distress debt and convertible securities trading at Lehman Brothers.

Early life and education
Lawrence McDonald was born in Lowell, Massachusetts and grew up in the Cape Cod region. He graduated from Falmouth High School. McDonald attended The University of Massachusetts Dartmouth and received a degree in economics in 1989.

Lawrence McDonald achieved notoriety in the financial world as COO/Co-founder of Convertbond.com.  Property rights to Convertbond.com were sold to Morgan Stanley.

Convertbond.com was named by Forbes Magazine "Best of the Web" from 2000 to 2003 as the World Wide Web's premier source for convertible securities information with news, valuation, terms and analysis tools for convertible securities.

Lawrence McDonald joined Lehman Brothers in New York City, in 2004 as vice-president of Distressed Debt and Convertible Securities Trading.  He was one of the most consistently profitable traders, netting $96 million during his time with the firm.

Larry was one of the early voices warning others of the sub-prime mortgage crisis.

Career
Lawrence G. McDonald is currently a keynote speaker, founder of The Bear Traps Report Investment Newsletter and partner at ACG Analytics.  He's also a financial consultant, global lecture speaker, and New York Times bestselling author of the book A Colossal Failure of Common Sense.

McDonald is the creator of The BEAR TRAPS REPORT, an investment newsletter providing weekly market insights, specific investments, and global trends.

McDonald is a frequent writer for Forbes Magazine and a guest contributor on Bloomberg, CNBC, and Fox Business News.

His skill set is unique as one of today's leading risk consultants and strategists.  He's been a keynote speaker in 16 different countries for various banks, investment firms, conferences, law firms, insurance companies, and universities.  He's highly regarded as a risk consultant to hedge funds, family offices, asset managers and high-net-worth investors. He has taken billion dollars of risk on the trading floor, and is a world-class European & Washington D.C policy risk strategist.

Lawrence McDonald's 21 Lehman Risk Indicators help investors get out of the way of painful risk off trades in the global markets.

Financial crisis
At the height of the 2008 financial crisis, Lawrence McDonald authored a book with writer Patrick Robinson on the fall of Lehman Brothers, A Colossal Failure of Common Sense.  The book is a risk manager's guide, and it explains why investors must stay ahead of policy actions coming from Washington D.C and Europe.  Published by Random House Crown Business, the book landed on the New York Times Best Seller's list in its first five days of release, and it's now a global bestseller translated into 12 different languages.

McDonald was a special advisor to the Financial Crisis Inquiry Commission (FCIC), created by Congress in 2009 to investigate the causes, domestic and global, of the economic and financial crisis in the United States.

Lawrence McDonald was a cast participant in major financial crisis documentary Inside Job, an Academy Award Winner for Best Documentary in 2010, directed by Charles H. Ferguson.  McDonald was also a cast participant in documentaries: BBC's The Love of Money and CBC's House of Cards.

In an editorial for the Huffington Post, McDonald was critical of former United States Secretary of the Treasury Henry Paulson's decision to save Bear Stearns while allowing Lehman Brothers to fail.

A Colossal Failure of Common Sense
In the book entitled A Colossal Failure of Common Sense, McDonald gives his account of the events surrounding the financial crisis of 2007–2010.  The book discusses JP Morgan Chase's purchase of Bear Stearns and the bankruptcy of Lehman Brothers.  The book was co-written with Patrick Robinson.

As of August 9, 2009, the book was 7th on the New York Times Best Seller list for hardcover nonfiction.

"A CFA Institute Top 20 All-Time - This book is a risk manager's guide to the right and wrong moves on Wall St., and explains why investors must stay ahead of policies coming out of Washington, D.C. and Europe." - CNBC.

A Colossal Failure of Common Sense is translated into 12 different languages.

References

External links
Excerpt from A Colossal Failure of Common Sense at NYTimes.com

Lehman Brothers
University of Massachusetts Dartmouth alumni
Living people
American financial writers
People from Lowell, Massachusetts
Year of birth missing (living people)